The 2020 BYU Cougars softball team represented Brigham Young University in the 2020 NCAA Division I softball season.  Gordon Eakin entered the year as head coach of the Cougars for an 18th consecutive season. 2020 was the seventh season for the Cougars as members of the WCC in softball. The Cougars entered 2020 having won their last 11 conference championships and as the favorites in the WCC. The Cougars never got to play in conference though as all athletic events were shut down by the school March 12 due to the COVID-19 pandemic.

2020 Roster

Schedule 

|-
!colspan=10 style="background:#002654; color:#FFFFFF;"| Puerto Vallarta College Challenge

 
|-
!colspan=10 style="background:#002654; color:#FFFFFF;"| Campbell Cartier Tournament

|-
!colspan=10 style="background:#002654; color:#FFFFFF;"| Mary Nutter Collegiate Classic

|-
!colspan=10 style="background:#002654; color:#FFFFFF;"| Judi Garman Classic

|-
!colspan=10 style="background:#002654; color:#FFFFFF;"| Bulldog Classic

|-
!colspan=10 style="background:#002654; color:#FFFFFF;"| T-Town Showdown

|-
!colspan=10 style="background:#002654; color:#FFFFFF;"| BYU Invitational

|-
!colspan=10 style="background:#002654; color:#FFFFFF;"| Bear Down Fiesta

|-
!colspan=10 style="background:#002654; color:#FFFFFF;"| Regular Season

|-
!colspan=10 style="background:#002654; color:#FFFFFF;"| Deseret First Duel

|-
!colspan=10 style="background:#002654; color:#FFFFFF;"| Regular Season

|-
!colspan=10 style="background:#002654; color:#FFFFFF;"| UCCU Crosstown Clash

|-
!colspan=10 style="background:#002654; color:#FFFFFF;"| Regular Season

|-
!colspan=10 style="background:#002654; color:#FFFFFF;"| UCCU Crosstown Clash

|-
!colspan=10 style="background:#002654; color:#FFFFFF;"| Regular Season

|-
!colspan=10 style="background:#002654; color:#FFFFFF;"| 2020 NCAA Division I softball tournament

TV, Radio, and Streaming Information
Feb. 6: No commentary (FloSoftball)
Feb. 6: No commentary (FloSoftball)
Feb. 7: No commentary (FloSoftball)
Feb. 8: No commentary (FloSoftball)
Feb. 13: Nick McGee (MW Net)
Feb. 20: Stu Paul (FloSoftball)
Feb. 20: Stu Paul (FloSoftball)
Feb. 21: Stu Paul (FloSoftball)
Feb. 22: Nick Gallopoulos (FloSoftball)
Feb. 22: Nick Gallopoulos (FloSoftball)
Feb. 27:  Dennis Ackerman (FloSoftball)
Feb. 27: Dennis Ackerman (FloSoftball)
Feb. 28: Dennis Ackerman (FloSoftball)
Feb. 28: Dennis Ackerman (FloSoftball)
Feb. 29: Dennis Ackerman (FloSoftball)
Mar. 5: Gabe Camarillo (MW Net)
Mar. 6: Greg Krikorian &  Dustin Vartanian (MW Net) 
Mar. 6: Greg Krikorian & Dustin Vartanian (MW Net)
Mar. 7: Gabe Camarillo & Dustin Vartanian (MW Net)

External links 
 BYU Softball at byucougars.com

References 

2020 team
2020 in sports in Utah
2020 West Coast Conference softball season